Silje Brøns Petersen (born 5 December 1994) is a handball player who plays for København Håndbold and since 2022 the German national team.

Early life
Brøns Petersen comes from the Copenhagen suburb of Herlev. She comes from a handball family: Her father was a player and is now a coach, her mother was a Champions League winner and her older sisters Emilie and Nikoline also play handball professionally as well.

Club career
As a teenager, Brøns Petersen was part of the Danish team at Rødovre HK and moved to the second division team Virum-Sorgefri HK in 2013.

In 2015, she moved to the Nemzeti Bajnokság I club Siófok KC. In Spring 2016, her one-year contract was extended, but in May of the same year the contract was terminated and Petersen returned to Virum-Sorgefri. In December 2016 she moved to HSG Blomberg-Lippe. In February 2018, her contract was extended to 2020. She then moved to TuS Metzingen.

International career
Brøns Petersen was called up to the German national team by head coach Henk Groener in November 2021. She made her international debut against Russia on 7 November.

References

External links

1994 births
Living people
People from Herlev Municipality
Danish female handball players
German female handball players
Sportspeople from the Capital Region of Denmark